Park Street School of Medicine was a private medical school in Dublin, Ireland.  It was founded on Park Street (now Lincoln Place), Dublin, in 1824 by a group of renowned physicians, including Robert James Graves and Arthur Jacob. In 1849, Professor Hugh Carlisle purchased for £500 the School's anatomy specimens which he relocated to Queen's College, Belfast.

Notable faculty
John Houston
Arthur Jacob

References

Medical schools in the Republic of Ireland
1824 establishments in Ireland
Educational institutions established in 1824